Red, in comics, may refer to:

 Red (manga), a 2006 manga by Sanae Rokuya
 Red (WildStorm),  a 2003/2004 three-issue comic book mini-series
 Red (1998), a manga by Kenichi Muraeda
 Red (2007), an award-winning manga by Naoki Yamamoto
 Red, a nickname given to Hellboy
 Red, a number of characters/concepts in DC Comics publications:
 Red, a DC Comics supervillain and member of the Rainbow Raiders
 Red, one of a trio of soldiers who were later reinvented in Kingdom Come, both times as the team Red, White and Blue
 The Red, part of the Parliament Enclave in Swamp Things stories, the most famous member being The Green
The Red is most closely associated with the heroes Animal Man, Vixen, B'wana Beast, and Beast Boy
 Red, three Marvel Comics characters:
 Red, a Golden Age gangster and enemy of the original Human Torch, who appeared in Marvel Comics #1
 Red, a member of S.H.I.E.L.D., who is the most advanced Life Model Decoy
 Red, a member of the Marauders in the Age of Apocalypse, who is an alternate version of the Green Goblin

References

See also
Red (disambiguation)
Red Dragon (comics)
Red King (comics)
Red Queen (comics)